Maestro is a board game published in 1989 by Hans im Glück.

Contents
Maestro is a game in which a player must fill ten orchestras of varying size with musicians from the player's theatrical agency.

Reception
Brian Walker reviewed Maestro for Games International magazine, and gave it 3 1/2 stars out of 5, and stated that "We found the game to be fun to play and quite skilful, though not something you'd want to spend all night over."

References

Board games introduced in 1989
Hans im Glück games